Walking to Babylon is a 1998 novel by Kate Orman in the Virgin New Adventures series featuring the fictional archaeologist Bernice Summerfield (known as Benny).

The New Adventures were a spin-off from the long-running British science fiction television series Doctor Who, but after the publisher Virgin Books lost the license to do Doctor Who stories from the BBC, the New Adventures continued, centred on the character of Benny and further characters and settings created for the series. Walking to Babylon is the tenth Benny-led New Adventure.

Orman had previously written several Doctor Who New Adventures, but this was her first for the post-Doctor Who series. As characterises her work, the novel mixes hard science fiction with strong characters. The book also contains some scenes of a sexual nature, reflecting Virgin's willingness to include more adult content than the BBC had allowed for the Doctor Who New Adventures.

The story features the People, an alien race were created in the Doctor Who New Adventure The Also People and subsequently appeared in many of the Bernice Summerfield New Adventures. The novel also indirectly refers to the Time Lords, a race from Doctor Who; this was to avoid any copyright disputes with the BBC.

The book opens by positing the conduct of a war between two super-powerful, time-travelling groups. A similar idea was being developed by fellow New Adventure author Lawrence Miles (which eventually saw its fullest exploration in his Faction Paradox stories), although Orman has said this was purely by coincidence. Miles has said his later New Adventure Dead Romance was in part inspired by his dislike of elements of Walking to Babylon.

Plot
Bernice Summerfield travels back in time to ancient Babylon to try to prevent the powerful race known only as the People from destroying the city with a singularity bomb.

Audio adaptation

In 1998, Walking to Babylon was adapted by Big Finish Productions into their third audio drama. The drama stars Lisa Bowerman as Bernice, but also features actor Elisabeth Sladen, better known for playing Sarah Jane Smith in the Doctor Who television series.

The adaptation was by Jac Rayner, who had also adapted the first release in the series, Oh No It Isn't!.

Cast
Bernice Summerfield — Lisa Bowerman
Ninan-ashtammu — Elisabeth Sladen
Jason Kane — Stephen Fewell
John Lafayette — Barnaby Edwards
WiRgo!xu — Nigel Fairs
!Ci!ci-tel — Anthony Keetch
The Drone — Steven Wickham
Miriam — Louise Morell
Babylonian Child — Alex Canini

Nigel Fairs, who performs in the audio adaptation by Big Finish, had previously worked on the Audio Visuals series of Doctor Who fan audio dramas.

External links

Walking to Babylon New Adventure
The Cloister Library - Walking to Babylon

1998 novels
1998 science fiction novels
Virgin New Adventures
Bernice Summerfield audio plays
Novels by Kate Orman
Novels about time travel